South Waterfront/South Moody, formerly South Waterfront/Southwest Moody, is a combined light rail and bus station located at 698 Southwest Porter Street in the South Waterfront neighborhood of Portland, Oregon, at the west end of the Tilikum Crossing bridge. It is serviced by the MAX Orange Line and TriMet buses.  Portland Streetcar travels through it but does not service it.

Station layout
The station sits at the west end of the Tilikum Crossing bridge. It consists of four tracks and two island platforms. The outer lanes are used by MAX trains and the inner lanes are used by the Portland Streetcar's Loop Service and buses. SW Moody Avenue, including the Portland Streetcar NS Line, cross the transit way just west of the station; there, the Loop Service merges with the NS Line and both share stops just to the north. East of the station, the Streetcar tracks merge with the MAX tracks to cross the Tilikum Crossing.

Bus service 
, TriMet bus lines FX2–Division, 9–Powell Blvd and 17–Holgate/Broadway serve the station, using stops located on the same platforms as used by MAX but a different section of each platform. In addition, TriMet bus lines 35–Macadam/Greeley and 36–South Shore pass by the station in the southbound direction (and serve the southbound streetcar stop). A fifth bus line serving the station is 291–Orange Night Bus, which substitutes for MAX service late at night and has only one or two trips per day.

References

2015 establishments in Oregon
MAX Light Rail stations
MAX Orange Line
Railway stations in Portland, Oregon
Railway stations in the United States opened in 2015
Southwest Portland, Oregon